Double Seven was an Indian soft drink brand. It was manufactured and marketed by the Indian government after Coca-Cola quit the Indian market in 1977 due to changes in government policies. Double Seven was launched at the annual trade fair at Pragati Maidan, New Delhi as a gift by the then ruling Janata Party.

In 1977, as per the provisions of the Foreign Exchange Regulation Act brought by the Morarji Desai government, Coca-Cola was required to reduce its ownership stake of its Indian operation. Coca-Cola along with other United States companies chose to leave India than to operate under the new laws.

Developed to fill the void left by Coca-Cola, Double Seven was quickly designed, named by a national competition for naming the product, manufactured and marketed by Modern Food Industries, a government-owned company. The formula for the concentrate of Double Seven was developed at Central Food Technological Research Institute, Mysore. Despite government backing, Double Seven could not dominate the Indian soft drinks market, however the program was very successful as the void left by Coca-Cola was filled. The main competitors to Double Seven were Campa Cola, Thums Up, Duke's, McDowell's Crush and Double Cola. Double Seven also had a lemon-lime soft drink known as Double Seven Tingle.

Double Seven was the winning name in a national competition to name the drink. The drink lost share of market as Indira Gandhi's government that came to power a few years later was not interested in supporting a product which reminded them of 1977, the year that Indira Gandhi lost the national elections and other drinks like Thums Up became very popular. Modern Food Industries gradually slipped into the red and was taken over by Hindustan Lever Limited in January 2000.

Thums Up, which was also launched in 1977 after the departure of Coca-Cola, continued to thrive until its eventual takeover by Coca-Cola.

See also
 List of defunct consumer brands

References

Products introduced in 1977
Indian drink brands
 
Defunct drink brands
Desai administration